Sykai or Sycae, later known as Justinianae or Ioustinianai and Justinianopolis or Ioustinianoupolis, was a town of ancient Thrace, a suburb of Byzantium/Constantinople, inhabited during Roman and Byzantine times. 

Its site is located near Galata in European Turkey.

References

Populated places in ancient Thrace
Former populated places in Turkey
Roman towns and cities in Turkey
Populated places of the Byzantine Empire
History of Istanbul Province